The 24 Hour Road Race to End Child Hunger was a mini date concert tour by American recording artist Hunter Hayes. The tour was notable because it broke the world record for the most live shows played in multiple cities in the span of 24 hours, with ten shows being played. According to the Guinness World Records, each city played had to be 31 miles apart. Half of the cities had to have a population of over 100,000 and all cities had to have a population of over 15,000. Also, Hayes was required to perform for fifteen continuous minutes at each show. The tour was in support of Hunters album Storyline.

Set list
The following set list is representative of the Philadelphia show. It is not representative of all concerts for the duration of the tour.
Storyline
Somebody's Heartbreak
Wanted
Tattoo
Invisible
I Want Crazy

Tour dates

References

2014 concert tours
Hunter Hayes concert tours